All Saints' Church is a Roman Catholic parish church situated between Dumplington and Barton upon Irwell, near Urmston, in Trafford, Greater Manchester, England. The church was constructed between 1867 and 1868 and was designed by E. W. Pugin in the Gothic Revival style for Sir Humphrey de Trafford. It is situated on Redclyffe Road, close to the Manchester Ship Canal. The church is a Grade I listed building and considered to be an example of Pugin's best work, according to Nikolaus Pevsner, "the masterpiece of [Pugin's] life, without any doubt." It has been served by priests from the Conventual Franciscans since 1928.

History

Construction
Construction work on the church started in 1867. It was designed by E. W. Pugin. It was paid for by Sir Humphrey de Trafford, who also paid Pugin to design to St Ann's Church, Stretford. In June 1868, the church was opened by Cardinal Henry Manning. From All Saints Church, priests started missions in the area to serve the local Catholic communities. These missions eventually became churches, such as St Teresa of Avila Church in Irlam, English Martyrs Church in Urmston, and Holy Cross Church in Eccles,

The church has timber pews, stained glass and gargoyles. There is a carved stone altar and reredos. The church also contains a painting depicting E. W. Pugin with a plan of the church.

Conventual Franciscans

In 1928, the Franciscan Order of Friars Minor Conventual came to Manchester. They began a mission in the Blackley area of Manchester, in the ward of Higher Blackley. In 1929, they built a temporary church there, St Clare's Church. In 1951, they built a friary there. On 11 August 1957, the foundation stone for the permanent St Clare's Church was laid by the Archbishop of Liverpool George Beck. In 1958, the church was opened.

In 1962, the Conventual Franciscans came to Barton and started working in All Saints Church. They continue to serve both All Saints Church and St Clare's Church today.

Exterior

See also
Grade I listed churches in Greater Manchester
List of churches in Greater Manchester
List of churches in the Diocese of Salford
Listed buildings in Urmston

References

External links
 
 All Saints' Church, Blackley from TheGreyFriars.org
 St Clare's Church, Blackley from TheGreyFriars.org

Roman Catholic churches completed in 1868
19th-century Roman Catholic church buildings in the United Kingdom
Grade I listed churches in Greater Manchester
Gothic Revival church buildings in Greater Manchester
Churches in Trafford
Roman Catholic churches in Greater Manchester
Grade I listed Roman Catholic churches in England
E. W. Pugin church buildings
Conventual Franciscan churches in the United Kingdom
Roman Catholic Diocese of Salford